Pedal Pusher is a play written by the English director and playwright, Roland Smith. Pedal Pusher revolves around the Tour de France in the late 1990s and early 2000s. It was developed from dialogue gleaned from interviews, biographies and archive footage. It premiered at London's Cavendish Gate Theatre in July 2009, starring Tom Daplyn, Josh Cass, Alexander Guiney and Graham O'Mara, directed by Roland Smith and produced by Theatre Delicatessen.

Plot
Pedal Pusher begins with Marco Pantani lying dead in a hotel room. The play goes on to describe a detailed account of the great rivalry, and achievements, of the three cycling legends – Armstrong, Ullrich and Pantani – and each of their individual struggles – Pantani's horrific 1995 crash and struggle with drugs, Ullrich's depression and subsequent drug allegations and Armstrong's fight against cancer.

References

External links
 Pedal Pusher on the theatredelicatessen website

2009 plays
English plays
West End plays
Fiction set in the 1990s
Fiction set in 2004
Plays based on actual events
Sports fiction